Amar Arshi is a Punjabi singer. He was born in Phagwara, Punjab, India. Currently, he is based out of London. His first album was released in 1991. His songs include "Aaja Ni Aaja", " Kaala Chasma" and "Rangli Kothi". "Kala Chashma" was remixed for a Bollywood movie Baar Baar Dekho (2016).

Discography

Albums

References

Punjabi people
Punjabi singers
Bollywood playback singers
Indian folk singers
Living people
Year of birth missing (living people)